Derek Webster may refer to:

 Derek Webster, British radio presenter on Boom Radio
 Derek Webster, publisher and editor of the Canadian magazine Maisonneuve
 Derek Webster, 1988 mayor of Newcastle upon Tyne
 Derek Webster (writer), candidate for the 2016 Gerald Lampert Award for poetry
 Derek Webster, television actor in, for example, In the Dark (American TV series)
 Derek Webster, basketball player; see 2020–21 The Citadel Bulldogs basketball team